Susan Piver is an American writer and meditation teacher.

Life 
Susan Piver has been a student of Buddhism since 1995 and writes books based on Buddhistic teachings and ideas. She has taught meditation since 2005. Her publications have made it into the New York Times Bestseller lists. Her latest book is The Four Noble Truths of Love: Buddhist Wisdom for Modern Relationships. In 2011 she launched the Open Heart Project, an online mindfulness community with close to 20,000 members.

Awards 
 2007: Books For A Better Life Award for the Book How Not to Be Afraid of Your Own Life

Works (selection) 
 The Four Noble Truths of Love: Buddhist Wisdom for Modern Relationships, 2018
 Start Here Now: An Open-Hearted Guide to the Path and Practice of Meditation, 2015
 The Wisdom of a Broken Heart, 2009
 Quiet Mind: A Beginner's Guide to Meditation, 2008
 How Not to Be Afraid of Your Own Life, 2007
 The Hard Questions for an Authentic Life: 100 Essential Questions for Tapping into Your Inner Wisdom, 2004
 The Hard Questions For Adult Children and Their Aging Parents, 2004
 The Hard Questions: 100 Essential Questions to Ask Before You Say I Do, 2000

References

External links 
 Homepage
 

American women writers
Place of birth missing (living people)